1 Gunwharf Quays, also known as East Side Plaza Tower or the Gunwharf Tower Building, is a  tall residential building with 26 floors, located at the Gunwharf Quays shopping complex, Portsmouth, Hampshire, United Kingdom.  It is commonly referred to as The Lipstick because of its shape, and was successfully completed in 2008. It has, at its base, a Brasserie Blanc restaurant.

The tower was the flagship of a three-part project that consisted of The Blue Building, The Crescent and The East Size Plaza tower (No1. Gunwharf Quays). The £50m project was completed in 2010.

The building also won Best Urban Regeneration Housing Scheme in 2004.

References

Residential buildings completed in 2008
Buildings and structures in Portsmouth
Towers in Hampshire